This is an alphabetical  list of online real estate databases.

Online real estate databases
Assist-2-Sell
Cyberhomes
Homes.com
Housing.com
Lamudi
LoopNet
MyNewPlace
Naked Apartments
NeighborhoodScout
Nestoria
Nuroa
RealEstateDatabase.net
Realtor.com
RealtyTrac
Redfin
Revaluate
Showing Suite
StreetEasy
Trulia
UrbanIndo
Zameen.com
Zillow
ZipRealty
Zoopla